Mularczyk is a Polish surname, it may refer to:
 Adam Mularczyk (1923-1996), Polish theatre director
 Andrzej Mularczyk (born 1930), Polish writer
 Arkadiusz Mularczyk (born 1971), Polish politician

Surnames of Polish origin
Polish-language surnames